Hot Resort is a 1985 comedy film directed by John Robins and starring Bronson Pinchot, Dan Schneider, Marcy Walker and Samm-Art Williams. It was shot on St Kitts with an American cast and crew.

Plot
Several young American men go to St Kitts for a summer job at a resort hotel, hoping to earn money for college and meet women. They clash with a group of wealthy Ivy League rowers there to film a soup commercial.

Production
Hot Resort was filmed on an Arriflex 35BL camera and 35 mm film, on location at the Royal St Kitts Hotel, St Kitts.

Reception
The Blockbuster Video Guide to Movies and Videos described it as a "cold sophomoric comedy." Leonard Maltin rated Hot Resort a "bomb" and gave it a "D".

In the Radio Times, Keith Bailey gave it one star, saying "There's not much in the way of humour in this teen comedy […] Poor old Frank Gorshin wanders in and out of the virtually plotless story, while Bronson Pinchot shows none of the comic talent that would later make him famous."

References

External links

1985 comedy films
Films set in Saint Kitts and Nevis
Films shot in Saint Kitts and Nevis
Golan-Globus films
Films produced by Yoram Globus
Films produced by Menahem Golan
Films set in hotels
1980s English-language films
Films with screenplays by Boaz Davidson